The Palazzo dell'Istituto Nazionale della Previdenza Sociale (INPS) is located facing Piazza Missori #10 in central Milan, region of Lombardy, Italy. The Istituto nazionale della previdenza sociale (National Institute for Social Security) is the main national department of the Italian public retirement system. This building was designed by Marcello Piacentini and completed in 1931 to house the regional offices. The INPS had new offices built in 1961 at via Melchiorre Gioia, but these are planned to be replaced.

The lower three stories of the elegant building is made with grey veined stone, and the upper stories are marked by monumental order pilasters and simple rounded arches framing the windows. The building has a convex front, with recessed wings, befitting the site. The central ground portal is decorated with allegorical representation of the duties and goals of the organization: amor, labor, domus, and providencia on the left and virtus, salus, fides, and praevidentia on the right. Of note, is the fascist inscription of Anno VIII, dating the completion to the 8th year Era Fascista, atop the brackets are two angels flanked by depictions of fasces.

References

Palaces in Milan
Italian fascist architecture